The Adairs Covered Bridge, also known as Cisna Mill Covered Bridge, is a historic wooden covered bridge located at Southwest Madison Township near Blain in Perry County, Pennsylvania, United States. It crosses Sherman Creek.

It was listed on the National Register of Historic Places in 1980.

Gallery

References

External links

Covered bridges on the National Register of Historic Places in Pennsylvania
Covered bridges in Perry County, Pennsylvania
Bridges completed in 1864
Wooden bridges in Pennsylvania
Bridges in Perry County, Pennsylvania
Tourist attractions in Perry County, Pennsylvania
1864 establishments in Pennsylvania
Bridges completed in 1919
National Register of Historic Places in Perry County, Pennsylvania
Road bridges on the National Register of Historic Places in Pennsylvania
Burr Truss bridges in the United States